"Fixer (While the Women Are Sleeping)" is the 51st and final single by Japanese entertainer Akina Nakamori. Written by Nakamori (under the pseudonym "Miran"), Dream Productions, and Brian Lee, the single was released on February 24, 2016, by Utahime Records and Universal Music Japan. This was Nakamori's second English-language single after "Unfixable". It was also the third single from her 24th studio album Fixer.

Background 
"Fixer (While the Women Are Sleeping)" was used as the image song for the 2016 film While the Women Are Sleeping. The B-side is "Hirari (Sakura)", co-written by Haruichi Shindō. The CD is arranged in an unconventional way, with the B-side playing before the main track.

Chart performance 
"Fixer (While the Women Are Sleeping)" peaked at No. 32 on Oricon's weekly singles chart and sold over 4,300 copies.

Track listing

Charts

References

External links 
 
 
 

2016 singles
2016 songs
Akina Nakamori songs
English-language Japanese songs
Universal Music Japan singles
Songs written by Brian Lee (songwriter)